The Chinese edible frog, East Asian bullfrog, or Taiwanese frog (Hoplobatrachus rugulosus) is a species of frog in the family Dicroglossidae. It is found in Cambodia, China, Hong Kong, Laos, Macau, Malaysia, Myanmar, the Philippines, Taiwan, Thailand, and Vietnam. Its natural habitats are freshwater marshes, intermittent freshwater marshes, arable land, pasture land, rural gardens, urban areas, ponds, aquaculture ponds, open excavations, irrigated land, seasonally flooded agricultural land, and canals and ditches. They breed in spring to early summer.

The domesticated Thai variety and wild Chinese populations of H. rugulosus belong to two separate genetic lineages respectively. Yu et al. (2015) suggest that H. rugulosus may in fact be a cryptic species complex.

Description
Females are larger than males. They are primarily insectivores.

Regional names
In Filipino, they are called "palakang bukid," which means "frog of the field."

Usage
The frogs are commonly found in wet markets, seafood markets, and pet stores. In wet markets, they are usually sold per piece or per kilogram. The medium-sized frogs are sold as pets in pet stores, and the smaller variant is sold as live food for arowanas. They are widely farmed in Sichuan, China, Malaysia, and Thailand.

These frogs, though much smaller than their Western counterparts, are used by Chinese to cook frog legs and by Filipinos who cook them for adobo dishes. The frog's forelimbs and hind legs are fried in oil, while in the adobo method (in which the entire frog is utilized), they are cooked in soy sauce and vinegar.

References

Hoplobatrachus
Frogs of Asia
Amphibians of Myanmar
Amphibians of Cambodia
Frogs of China
Fauna of Hong Kong
Amphibians of Laos
Amphibians of Malaysia
Amphibians of the Philippines
Amphibians of Taiwan
Amphibians of Thailand
Amphibians of Vietnam
Taxonomy articles created by Polbot
Amphibians described in 1834